Cave Bay is located on the southeast coast of Barbados, between Long Bay and Bottom Bay. It is located in Saint Phillip Parish. There is a dangerous undertow in the area, however, there are no lifeguards.

References

 

Bays of Barbados